This page documents all tornadoes confirmed by various weather forecast offices of the National Weather Service in the United States during September to October 2019. Tornado counts are considered preliminary until final publication in the database of the National Centers for Environmental Information.

United States yearly total

September

September 1 event

September 2 event

September 3 event

September 4 event

September 5 event
Events were associated with Hurricane Dorian.

September 6 event

September 8 event

September 9 event

September 10 event

September 11 event

September 12 event

September 16 event

September 18 event
Event was associated with Tropical Storm Imelda.

September 19 event
Event was associated with Tropical Storm Imelda.

September 20 event

September 21 event

September 22 event

September 23 event

September 24 event

September 25 event

September 27 event

September 28 event

September 29 event

September 30 event

October

October 1 event

October 2 event

October 4 event

October 8 event

October 16 event

October 18 event
Florida events were associated with Tropical Storm Nestor.

October 19 event
Events were associated with Tropical Storm Nestor.

October 20 event
South Carolina event was associated with Tropical Storm Nestor.

October 21 event

October 22 event

October 25 event

October 31 event

See also
 Tornadoes of 2019
 List of United States tornadoes from June to August 2019
 List of United States tornadoes from November to December 2019

Notes

References 

2019 natural disasters in the United States
2019-related lists
Tornadoes of 2019
Tornadoes
2019, 9